Nuts in May may refer to:

 "Nuts in May" (Play for Today)
 "Nuts in May" (rhyme)
 Nuts in May (film)
 Nuts in May (novel)